Barefoot Blue Jean Night is the third studio album by American country music artist Jake Owen. It was released on August 30, 2011 via RCA Records Nashville. The album's first single, "Barefoot Blue Jean Night," is the fastest-rising single of Owen's career, as well as his first Number One hit.

Critical reception

Giving it two-and-a-half stars out of five, AllMusic's Stephen Thomas Erlewine wrote that Owen "is a likable enough presence but he can't sell the cold calculations of these transparent good times". Michael Sudhalter of Country Standard Time gave the album a positive review. He thought that the album had "plenty of versatility" and that its title track is "just right for the summer time". Similarly, Bobby Peacock of Roughstock thought that the album's songs had several overlapping themes and that Owen "has truly put out an album that he should be proud of", giving it four-and-a-half stars out of five. In 2017, Billboard contributor Chuck Dauphin placed three tracks from the album on his top 10 list of Owen's best songs: "Alone with You" at number one, the title track at number two and "Anywhere with You" at number ten.

Track listing

Tracks 1, 2, 4, 6, 8, and 11 produced by Joey Moi and Rodney Clawson; tracks 3, 5, 7, 9, 10 produced by Tony Brown.

Personnel
Tom Bukovac - acoustic guitar, electric guitar
Sarah Buxton - background vocals
Perry Coleman - background vocals
Chad Cromwell - drums, percussion
Glen Duncan - banjo, dobro
Kyle Everson - programming
Shannon Forrest - drums
Kenny Greenberg - acoustic guitar, electric guitar
Wes Hightower - background vocals
John Barlow Jarvis - Hammond B-3 organ, keyboards, piano, Wurlitzer
Charlie Judge - Hammond B-3 organ, piano, synthesizer
Brent Mason - electric guitar
Jerry McPherson - electric guitar
Joey Moi - programming
Steve Nathan - Hammond B-3 organ, piano
Jake Owen - acoustic guitar, lead vocals
Michael Rhodes - bass guitar
Adam Shoenfeld - electric guitar
Jimmie Lee Sloas - bass guitar
Chris Tompkins - programming
Ilya Toshinsky - banjo, dobro, acoustic guitar

Charts

Weekly charts

Year-end charts

Certifications

References

2011 albums
Jake Owen albums
RCA Records albums
Albums produced by Tony Brown (record producer)
Albums produced by Joey Moi